The Akkuyu Nuclear Power Plant is the only large nuclear power plant in Turkey and is under construction at Akkuyu, in Büyükeceli, Mersin Province. It is expected to generate around 10% of the country's electricity when completed.

In May 2010, Russia and Turkey signed an agreement that a subsidiary of Rosatom would build, own, and operate a power plant at Akkuyu comprising four 1,200 MWe VVER1200 units. Construction of the first reactor has commenced in April 2018. In February 2013, Russian nuclear construction company Atomstroyexport (ASE) and Turkish construction company Özdoğu signed the site preparation contract for the proposed Akkuyu Nuclear Power Plant. The contract includes excavation work at the site.

The official launch ceremony took place in April 2015, and the first unit is expected to be completed in 2023.

It is expected to be the first build–own–operate nuclear power plant in the world.

History
In May 2010, Russia and Turkey signed an agreement that a subsidiary of Rosatom — Akkuyu NGS Elektrik Uretim Corp. (APC: Akkuyu Project Company) — would build, own, and operate a power plant at Akkuyu comprising four 1,200 MW VVER units. The agreement was ratified by the Turkish Parliament in July 2010.
Engineering and survey work started at the site in 2011.

In 2013, Russian nuclear construction company Atomstroyexport (ASE) and Turkish construction company Ozdogu signed the site preparation contract for the proposed Akkuyu nuclear power plant. The contract includes excavation work at the site.

The official launch ceremony took place in April 2015. 

 

On 9 December 2015, the news agency Reuters reported that Rosatom stopped construction work at the power plant and that Turkey was assessing other potential candidates for the project. But Rosatom and the Turkish Energy and Natural Resource Ministry promptly refuted the statement. Despite tensions mounted between Russia and Turkey, due to the Turkish downing of a Russian fighter jet on 24 November (2015), Russian President Vladimir Putin stated that the decision to continue is purely a commercial one. 
A source told RIA Novosti that the company set up to construct the nuclear plant continued its operations in Turkey.

Major construction started in March 2018. In March 2019, the concrete basemat of unit 1 had been completed.

Construction of the second unit started on 26 June 2020. Steam generators for unit 1 were completed by Atommash later in August to be shipped to Turkey. Around the same time, a core melt trap for unit 2 to contain a nuclear meltdown arrived at Akkuyu to be placed in the plant. GE Steam Power is supplying four Arabelle steam turbines manufactured at Belfort, France, for the project, the first in January 2021.

Akkuyu Nuclear Power Plant's Construction Organization Director is Denis Sezemin.

The first unit is hoped to become operational in 2023, but in 2022 Rosatom was having difficulty obtaining equipment from third countries. The other three units are expected to be complete by 2025.

Economics
Financing is provided by Russian investors, with 93% from a Rosatom subsidiary.  Up to 49% of shares may be sold later to other investors.

Turkish Electricity Trade and Contract Corporation (TETAS) has guaranteed the purchase of 70% power generated from the first two units and 30% from the third and fourth units over a 15-year power purchase agreement. Electricity will be purchased at a price of 12.35 US cents per kW·h and the remaining power will be sold in the open market by the producer. 
According to energy analysts this price is high.

According to President Erdoğan nuclear power will make the country more economically independent. Although it will be technically possible to ramp power up and down, because fuel is a small part of the cost and operating costs remain the same there is almost no economic benefit in load-following, therefore nuclear is expected to supply baseload power. For baseload power levelized cost of electricity (LCOE) and Value-Added LCOE (VALCOE) are the same. In 2020 Shura Energy Center forecast that for nuclear power that will be 80-85 USD/MWh in 2040.

Operator liability is limited to 700 million euros, and above that will be the responsibility of the Nuclear Damage Detection Commission.

Flexibility
The minimum load for the plant is expected to be 50%. In normal operation power output could be decreased at 1% of the reactor’s nominal capacity per minute and increased at 3% per minute. In case of grid emergencies, these rates can increase to 20% and 5% respectively. However, "load following mode generates more radioactive waste as a result of adjusting the coolant level and concentration of boric acid in the reactor". The plant is instead expected to provide baseload power.

Objections

One objection is that Büyükeceli and the surrounding coastline may lose its touristic potential after the realization of the project. However, the president of the township's commercial counsel Alper Gursoy also added that nuclear energy is necessary for Turkey's economy and that the construction of such a large plant may benefit the town economically.

In 2011, a human chain was formed in Mersin to protest the decision.

In 2015, it was reported that the signatures of specialists on a government-sanctioned environmental impact report had been forged. The specialists had resigned six months prior to its submission, and the contracting company had then made unilateral changes to the report. The revelation sparked protest in North Nicosia. The construction of the Akkuyu plant is controversial in Cyprus, because it is close to the island.

It has been suggested that the plant will affect Russia–Turkey relations by prolonging Turkey's dependence on Russian energy, beyond natural gas. It has been suggested that there is a risk of algal blooms. It has been suggested that spent fuel pools are at risk of military action or terrorism.

Reactor data 

Expected lifetime is 60 years and after that a 20 year extension may be possible. Expected annual generation is 35 billion kWh when complete.

When operating at full power about one million cubic meters of cooling water per hour will be used and returned to Akkuyu Bay.

A megatsunami like that caused by the Minoan eruption could reach the reactors. In case that or another event caused a meltdown there are core catchers, which are traps below the pressure vessels to catch and cool anything which falls out. The site was undamaged by the 2023 Turkey–Syria earthquake.

Regulation

Waste

The spent fuel is high-level waste and will be returned to Russia. As of 2019 all other radioactive waste in Turkey is sent to TAEK storage in Kuçukçekmece designed for low and intermediate level waste. However it was reported in 2022 that low and intermediate level waste will be compressed and stored on site. But it was also reported in 2022 that a site had not been selected.

In 2021   parliament passed the bill “Joint Convention on the Safety of Spent Fuel Management and on the Safety of Radioactive Waste Management” and ratified the  Convention on Civil Liability Against Third Parties in the Field of Nuclear Energy. Law 7381 is partly about waste.

See also

List of commercial nuclear reactors#Turkey
Nuclear power in Russia

Sources

References

Nuclear power stations in Turkey
Nuclear power stations with reactors under construction
Buildings and structures in Mersin Province
Nuclear power stations using VVER reactors
Buildings and structures under construction in Turkey